XHMOM-FM is a noncommercial radio station on 99.1 FM in Morelia, Michoacán, Mexico. It is owned by Medios Radiofónicos Michoacán through permitholder Flavio René Acevedo and carries its Clasics format, which is carried on MRM's three permit stations in the state.

XHMOM received its permit on June 26, 2013.

References

2013 establishments in Mexico
Radio stations established in 2013
Radio stations in Michoacán